Playa del Barranco is a beach in the municipality of Algeciras, southeastern Spain. It overlooks the Bay of Algeciras. It is approximately 500 metres in length. To the north is the Playa de El Rinconcillo.

External links
Playa del Barranco at Ruralvive.com 

Algeciras
Beaches of Andalusia
Geography of the Province of Cádiz